The Prairie College Conference was an intercollegiate athletic conference that existed from 1953 to 1991. The league had members the states of Illinois and Indiana. The Prairie College Conference formed in 1953 with eight members: Blackburn College in Carlinville, Illinois, Concordia Seminary in Springfield, Illinois, Eureka College in Eureka, Illinois, Greenville College—now known as Greenville University—in Greenville, Illinois, McKendree College—now known as McKendree University—in Lebanon, Illinois, Principia College in Elsah, Illinois, Rose Polytechnic Institute—now known as Rose–Hulman Institute of Technology—in Terre Haute, Indiana, and Shurtleff College in Alton, Illinois.

Football champions

1953 – Rose Polytechnic
1954 – Principia (IL)
1955 – Principia (IL) and Illinois College
1956 – Principia (IL)
1957 – Rose Polytechnic
1958 – Rose Polytechnic

1959 – Illinois College and Principia (IL)
1960 – Principia (IL)
1961 – Illinois College and Principia (IL)
1962 – Principia (IL)
1963 – Principia (IL)
1964 – Principia (IL)

1965 – Illinois College, Principia (IL), Rose Polytechnic
1966 – Principia (IL)
1967 – Principia (IL)
1968–1987 – conference did not sponsor football
1988 – Greenville (IL)

See also
List of defunct college football conferences

References

Prairie College Conference (1953–1967)
College sports in Illinois
College sports in Indiana